Patrik Schumacher (born 1961, Bonn, Germany) is a London based architect and architectural theorist. He is the principal architect of Zaha Hadid Architects.

Education and early career
Schumacher studied Philosophy and Mathematics at the Friedrich Wilhelm University in Bonn in the early 1980s. In the mid-eighties he studied architecture in Stuttgart and in 1987 continued his architecture study at London Southbank University. In 1988, Schumacher worked in the design studio of Zaha Hadid, on the Vitra Firestation. In 1990, he returned to University of Stuttgart to complete his Diploma in Architecture and then re-joined Hadid. In 1999, he completed a PhD at the Institute of Cultural Science, Klagenfurt University.

Teaching
Schumacher started a teaching career in 1993, teaching a post-graduate diploma course in architecture at Kingston University. From 1994 to 1996 Schumacher was assistant professor at the Technical University of Berlin (TU). In 1996 he founded with Brett Steele the Design Research Laboratory (AADRL) at the Architectural Association School of Architecture in London.

Professional career
Since its incorporation in the late 1990s, Schumacher served as a director of Zaha Hadid Architects (ZHA) and is credited as partner and co-author of the practice's output. Since Hadid's death in April 2016, he has been leading the firm as its sole remaining partner remains true to their shared vision.

Theory and research
Schumacher has been publishing theoretical articles in architectural magazines and anthologies since 1996, arguing for an expanded formal and spatial design repertoire as architecture's response to the new level of societal complexity and dynamism brought on by the socio-economic transition from Fordism to Post-Fordism. Schumacher has also prompted controversy by promoting pro-free market ideas against social housing, housing regulations and a centralised urban planning system. Schumacher's viewpoints are aligned with anarcho-capitalism, in favour of complete decentralisation and radical privatisation of all aspects of architecture, planning and development.

Schumacher uses the term "parametricism" to denote the use in architecture of advanced computational design techniques. In 2008 he launched a manifesto for "parametricism" at the Venice Biennale of Architecture and a year later published the article "Parametricism: A New Global Style for Architecture and Urban Design" in the journal Architectural Design.

In 2011, Schumacher published the first volume of The Autopoiesis of Architecture, which he called his "opus magnum", offering a "New Framework for Architecture", followed by the second volume, subtitled A New Agenda for Architecture in 2012.

Writings
 2011 
 2012

References

1961 births
Living people
20th-century German architects
21st-century German architects
People from Baden-Württemberg